"Manhoo" is the eighth single from Cardiacs and the first taken from Sing to God. Only 1000 copies of the CD were produced and it has long since been out of print.

The single was supposed to be the first of four singles from the Sing to God album with each cover dedicated to a band member, but only two were produced, the second being "Odd Even".  The other two on the single are exclusive to this release and have not been reproduced on any other release.

Track listing
 "Manhoo"
 "Spinney"
 "What Paradise Is Like"

Lineup
 Tim Smith – guitar, vocals, keyboards
 Jim Smith – bass
 Bob Leith – drums
 Jon Poole – guitar on various bits

Cardiacs songs
1995 singles
1995 songs
Songs written by Tim Smith (Cardiacs)